William Reynolds James Albertini (21 January 1913 – 2 May 1994) was an English first-class cricketer.  Albertini's batting and bowling styles are unknown.  He was born at Kensington, London as William Reynolds James Diaz-Albertini, later changing his name to William Reynolds James Albertini.  Later in his life he would revert to his birth name.  He was educated at Tonbridge School.

Albertini was his debut for Berkshire in the 1936 Minor Counties Championship against Hertfordshire.  He played Minor counties cricket for the county till 1938, making a total of twenty appearances.  He was also a part of Sir Theodore Brinckman's team which toured Argentina in 1937/38, making three first-class appearances on the tour against the Argentine national team.  He scored a total of 50 runs in these three matches, which came at an average of 16.66, with a high score of 15 not out.  With the ball, he took 3 wickets at a bowling average of 38.00, with best figures of 1/20.

He died on 2 May 1994 at Barnard, Vermont, United States of America.  He is buried at the Christ Church Frederica Cemetery in St. Simons, Georgia.

References

External links
William Albertini at ESPNcricinfo
William Albertini at CricketArchive

1913 births
1994 deaths
Sportspeople from Kensington
People educated at Tonbridge School
English cricketers
Berkshire cricketers
Sir T. E. W. Brinckman's XI cricketers